The United Arab Emirates national under-23 football team represents United Arab Emirates in association football and is administered by the United Arab Emirates Football Association.

Recent Fixtures

Players

Current squad 
 The following players were selected to compete in the 2022 AFC U-23 Asian Cup in June 2022

Overage players in Olympic football

Tournament records

Olympic Games

Matches

Asian Cup 

*Draws include knockout matches decided on penalty kicks.

Matches

Asian Games

GCC Championship

Reference

See also 
United Arab Emirates national football team
United Arab Emirates national under-17 football team
United Arab Emirates national under-20 football team results

Asian national under-23 association football teams